The UEFA qualifiers for the 2019 World Beach Games, known officially as the 2019 World Beach Games – Europe Qualifier Salou, was a beach soccer tournament contested by European national teams who are members of UEFA that took place to determine the nations from Europe that qualified to the beach soccer events at the inaugural edition of the ANOC World Beach Games.

The tournament consisted of two events: the men's qualifiers and the women's qualifiers, the former a knockout competition from which the top five teams qualified, and the latter a round robin contest from which the top three teams qualified.

Organised by Beach Soccer Worldwide (BSWW), the competition took place in Salou, Spain from 9–12 May 2019.

The men's crown was won by Russia whilst the women's champions were England.

Venues
For both the men's and women's tournaments, the two new beach soccer pitches that comprise part of the Complex Esportiu Futbol Salou in the city of Salou, Spain were used as venues.

Referred to as simply "Pitch 1" and "Pitch 2", the former, the main arena, had grandstands installed specially for the competition, with a capacity of 1,000.

Men's tournament

Teams 
The men's event was a 16-team tournament; entry was limited to the top 16 teams of the BSWW European Ranking issued for January 2019 – these nations received invitations to participate.

Three of the top 16 declined the invitations. Therefore, the next best teams in the ranking were then summoned in turn until three teams had accepted the invitation to fill the vacant spots.

The final entrants are listed below, ordered by the aforementioned European Ranking in parentheses (members of the ranking who could have entered but rejected invitations are struck-through):

Draw
The draw for the opening round of the tournament, which also defined the arrangement of the teams in the bracket, took place at 12:00 CEST on April 15 at the headquarters of BSWW in Barcelona, Spain. The draw was assisted by Spanish forward Llorenç Gomez.

For the purpose of the draw, the 16 teams were split into four pots of four according to their world ranking – the highest ranked teams (plus the hosts) were placed in Pot 1, next highest in Pot 2 and so on, down to the lowest ranked teams placed in Pot 4. For each tie, teams from Pot 1 were drawn against teams from Pot 4 and Pot 2 nations were drawn to face those from Pot 3. The drawing of ties alternated as such and in the order they were drawn, each pairing was placed in the bracket from top to bottom.

The composition of the pots is shown below (World Ranking in parentheses):

Results
The competition was played as a straight knockout tournament; starting with the round of 16, the winners of each round advanced through to the quarter-finals, semi-finals and ultimately the final with the winner crowned champions of the event. Meanwhile, the losing nations of each round receded to play in a series of consolation rounds and/or matches in order to determine all final placements. This meant all participants contested four matches.

The four teams that reached the semi-finals and the winner of the fifth place match qualified for the 2019 World Beach Games.

Matches are listed as local time in Salou, (UTC+2).

Awards

Winners trophy

Individual awards

Top goalscorers
Players who scored at least 4 goals are listed.

Final standings

Source: BSWW

Women's tournament

Teams
Five teams entered the women's event which are as follows; their European Ranking is in parentheses:

Results
The competition was played as a single round robin tournament; the teams competed to earn points for the overall standings table – the three that accumulated the most points after all the matches were completed qualified for the 2019 World Beach Games.

Matches are listed as local time in Salou, (UTC+2).

Awards

Winners trophy

Individual awards

Top goalscorers
Players who scored at least 3 goals are listed.

See also
2019 FIFA Beach Soccer World Cup qualification (UEFA)

References

External links
World Beach Games - Europe Qualifier Salou 2019, at Beach Soccer Worldwide
World Beach Games 2019 – Qualifying Tournament – Europe, at Beach Soccer Russia (in Russian)
World Beach Games 2019 – Qualifying Tournament – Europe, Women, at Beach Soccer Russia (in Russian)

World Beach Games
2019
2019
May 2019 sports events in Spain
2019 in Spanish sport